GAC Hino is a joint venture between Hino and GAC aimed at producing Hino-based trucks and headquartered in Guangzhou, China, where it has its single assembly facility.

The venture emerged from the merging of two previous Chinese automotive companies: Yangcheng Auto and Shenfei Hino.

History

Hino's early involvement in China
In 1978, Hino established a partnership with the Chinese car manufacturer FAW by providing technical assistance on medium trucks to it, mostly for improving FAW's Soviet era Jiefanghao range. The first direct involvement in China from Hino was in 2003, when they set up an engine plant in Shanghai.

Shenfei Hino
In 1980, the state-owned enterprise Shenfei Group established a bus manufacturing company at Shenyang named as Shenyang Shenfei Automotive (organised as a limited company in December 1993). In December 2002, Shenfei, Hino, and Toyota Tsusho agreed to re-incorporate the company as a joint venture, Shenyang Shenfei Hino Automotive Manufacturing Co., Ltd. (Shenfei Hino), focused on producing Hino buses. At the end of 2003, the joint venture completed a new bus assembly facility.

Yangcheng Auto
In 1958, the Guangzhou municipal government established the Guangzhou Yangcheng Automotive Plant, later renamed as Yangcheng Auto Company as it became a joint venture between GAC and Hong Kong Zhonglong Investment Company. It built Isuzu-based light trucks and other commercial vehicles.

Creation of GAC Hino
Both Yangcheng Auto and Shenfei Hino had low sales. In December 2007, GAC and Hino formed the GAC Hino joint venture (an equally-owned venture) by absorbing and reorganising Yangcheng and Shenfei Hino. Both bases (Shenyang and Guangzhou) were kept by GAC Hino until a new facility for producing trucks (the Conghua plant) were completed in Guangzhou. GAC Hino also kept on managing the Yangcheng lineup. In 2008, GAC announced it planned to put Yangcheng production under the GAC marque.

In mid-2009, after some GAC problems, the new Guanghzhou plant started operations, producing variants of the Hino 700. That same year, the company also relaunched bus production at Shenyang. In 2016, the Shengyang operations stopped assembly and were dissolved, following constant yearly losses.

In the period between 2009 and 2011, GAC Hino products were only available in Guangdong and the company could keep a production volume of over 1,000 vehicles because the 700 truck was designated for building infrastructure of the 2009 East Asian Games.

Products and facilities
The Guangzhou's Conghua plant is the only production base of GAC Hino and has two assembly lines for heavy trucks with a maximum capacity of 
20,000 units per year. It produces approximately 5,000 
units per year on average. The plant uses the same multi-skilled work system as the Hino's Hamura plant in Japan.

, the plant produces the Hino 700 on different configurations.

References

GAC Group joint ventures
Vehicle manufacturing companies established in 2007
Toyota Group